Mathri (Mathi) is a Rajasthani snack. It is a kind of flaky biscuit from north-west region of India. Once a local delicacy, mathi or mathri as its often called, is now available in almost all sweet shops in India. Similar to Namak para, it is made from flour, water, and, optionally, carom seeds. The creation of this snack was influenced by the need for food that will stay edible for days. The finished products are often stored in big jars at room temperature. Mathri is a popular snack to take along during travels.

Mathri is served with mango, chilli or lemon pickle along with tea. It is also served at marriages and poojas. Masala mathri is a variant of mathri with spices added to make it more crispy. Mathri is also available in different flavours, such as fenugreek leaves (methi), pickle (achari mathri), cumin (jeera) and masala (mixed spices).

It is one of the most popular snacks in North India, and is part of most marriage cooking or religious occasions like Karva Chauth and even as tea-time snack.

See also
 Namak pare

References

External links
 Mathri recipe
Rajasthani Mathri Recipe Video
Rajasthani Lehsun Mathri Recipe Video

Indian snack foods
Indian fast food
North Indian cuisine
Rajasthani cuisine